The parrot-billed seedeater (Sporophila peruviana) is a small species of bird in the family Thraupidae. It is found in various shrubby habitats in western Ecuador and western Peru. Outside the breeding season, it is quite social and frequently seen in flocks with other small seed-eating birds.

References

External links
Images at ADW

parrot-billed seedeater
Birds of Ecuador
Birds of Peru
Birds of the Tumbes-Chocó-Magdalena
Western South American coastal birds
parrot-billed seedeater
Taxonomy articles created by Polbot